Route 610 is a  long north–south secondary highway in the eastern portion of New Brunswick, Canada.

The route starts at Route 104 in Upper Hainesville northeast of the town of Nackawic. The road travels southwest through a mostly forested area to the community of Upper Caverhill at the western terminus of Route 615. Continuing, the road ends at Route 105 in Upper Queensbury on the north bank of the Saint John River.

History

See also

References

610
610